Jiang Xinyu and Tang Qianhui were the defending champions, but they lost in the first round to Gai Ao and Zheng Wushuang. 

Harriet Dart and Ankita Raina won the title after defeating Liu Fangzhou and Xun Fangying 6–3, 6–3 in the final.

Seeds

Draw

Draw

References
Main Draw

Jin'an Open - Doubles
Jin'an Open